Murat Belge (born March 16, 1943) is a Turkish academic, translator, literary critic, columnist, civil rights activist, and occasional tour guide.

Career 
Belge was a member of the organizing committee for a two-day academic conference that started on September 24, 2005, held at Istanbul Bilgi University in Istanbul, titled "Ottoman Armenians During the Decline of the Empire: Issues of Scientific Responsibility and Democracy". The conference offered an open dispute of the official Turkish account of the Armenian genocide, and was denounced by nationalists as treacherous.

Belge's remarks led to his facing a ten-year jail sentence for criticizing the judicial ban; he was acquitted. He also commented, "We have a very unhealthy relation with our history … It’s basically a collection of lies."

A leaked Turkish military memo, dated November 2006 (reported by Nokta in March 2007, prior to being shut down), lists journalist deemed "trustworthy" and "untrustworthy" by the Turkish Armed Forces. Murat Belge was listed as "untrustworthy."

Since 1996 he has been a professor of comparative literature at Istanbul Bilgi University.

Personal life and education
He is the son of political journalist Burhan Asaf Belge (who was married to Hungarian-American socialite Zsa Zsa Gabor from May 1935 to December 1941), nephew of Yakup Kadri Karaosmanoğlu, and the grandson of a former governor of Bursa. He received his Ph.D. from Istanbul University in 1969 on leftist criticism in English literature. From his student years in the 1960s, until the early 1980s, he had been an active participant of a close-knit left-wing group of scholars at Istanbul University's Department of English Language and Literature; he used to be a Marxist himself. His fellow scholars of those years included Berna Moran, Mina Urgan, Cevat Capan, Aksit Gokturk and Vahit Turhan. After the military coups of 1971 and 1980, he was compelled to leave academic life and began publishing left-wing classics with Iletisim Press in Istanbul.

Since the early 1980s, he has been guiding tours of Istanbul's yalılar (waterfront mansions).

He is married to actress Hale Soygazi.

Writing
Belge is one of the founders of Birikim, a leftist cultural magazine. For several years he wrote columns for the daily Radikal, before shifting to Taraf in June 2008. On December 14, 2012, Belge stepped down from his post at Taraf together with editor-in-chief Ahmet Altan, assistant editor Yasemin Çongar and columnist Neşe Tüzel, and he has written occasionally for openDemocracy since 2001.

Belge has translated works of James Joyce, Charles Dickens, D. H. Lawrence, William Faulkner and John Berger into Turkish. He is an active member of the Helsinki Citizens Assembly.

References

External links
 Columns for Taraf
 Columns for Radikal
 Articles for openDemocracy

Turkish atheism activists
20th-century Turkish historians
Turkish literary critics
21st-century Turkish historians
Literary critics of English
Turkish translators
1943 births
People from Ankara
Istanbul University alumni
Academic staff of Istanbul Bilgi University
Living people
Turkish activists
Turkish former Muslims
Taraf people
Turkish magazine founders